Vinus van Baalen (1 July 1942 – 21 August 2012) was a Dutch swimmer. He competed in two events at the 1964 Summer Olympics.

References

External links
 

1942 births
2012 deaths
Dutch male freestyle swimmers
Olympic swimmers of the Netherlands
People from Aalten
Sportspeople from Gelderland
Swimmers at the 1964 Summer Olympics
20th-century Dutch people